The Caroline flying fox or Pohnpei flying fox (Pteropus molossinus) is a species of megabat in the genus Pteropus, endemic to Micronesia. Its natural habitat is subtropical or tropical dry forests. Prior to a ban on commercial exploitation, it was hunted for export, substantially impacting its abundance.  It is threatened by habitat loss due to expanding plantations.

Sources

Fauna of Micronesia
Pteropus
Mammals described in 1853
Taxonomy articles created by Polbot